Many individual states within the US have accessibility policies for Information and Communications Technology (ICT).  These policies often include references to national or international standards. They provide websites and software authors with technical details to ensure that users with disabilities can access the information and that adequate functionality is assured. The most commonly referenced standards are Section 508 and the W3C's Web Content Accessibility Guidelines. The table below provides information for all fifty states and indicates whether policies are in place for websites and software. It also indicates what standards the web policies are based on and provides links to the policies.

External links

Blindness equipment
Computer accessibility
Computer law